Natalia Medvedeva and Larisa Savchenko won in the final 7–6(7–5), 4–6, 6–1 against Silvia Farina and Barbara Schett.

Seeds
Champion seeds are indicated in bold text while text in italics indicates the round in which those seeds were eliminated.

Seeds

Draw

External links
 1996 Kremlin Cup Women's Doubles Draw

Kremlin Cup
Kremlin Cup